Francesco Bruno (born 15 June 1978) is an Italian sport shooter. He won a gold medal at the 2005 Mediterranean Games, and competed in three consecutive Summer Olympics for his native country, starting in 2004. He was born in Foggia.

He shoots with the Benelli Kite air pistol.

References
 

1978 births
Living people
Italian male sport shooters
ISSF pistol shooters
Olympic shooters of Italy
Shooters at the 2004 Summer Olympics
Shooters at the 2008 Summer Olympics
Shooters at the 2012 Summer Olympics
Mediterranean Games gold medalists for Italy
Competitors at the 2005 Mediterranean Games
Mediterranean Games medalists in shooting
21st-century Italian people